Springfield is a town in Sullivan County, New Hampshire, United States. The population was 1,259 at the 2020 census. Gile State Forest is located within the town.

History 
First settled by Europeans in 1769 and named "Protectworth", the town adopted the name "Springfield" when it was incorporated in 1794. Prior to county division in 1827, Springfield was in Cheshire County.

Geography
Springfield occupies the northeast corner of Sullivan County. The northwest part of town, including the town center, is drained by Bog Brook and its tributaries, leading west to Stocker Brook in Grantham and part of the Sugar River watershed leading west to the Connecticut River. The southeast part of the town, including Baptist Pond and Star Lake, drains south to Lake Sunapee, the headwaters of the Sugar River. The northeast part of town is drained by Kimpton Brook and tributaries of Walker Brook, part of the Blackwater River watershed leading to the Contoocook River and eventually the Merrimack, while the far northeast corner of town is drained by tributaries of Smith Brook, which leads northeast to the Smith River, then the Pemigewasset River, and finally the Merrimack. 

Adjacent municipalities
 Grafton, New Hampshire (north)
 Wilmot, New Hampshire (east)
 New London, New Hampshire (southeast)
 Sunapee, New Hampshire (south)
 Croydon, New Hampshire (southwest)
 Grantham, New Hampshire (west)
 Enfield, New Hampshire (northwest)

Demographics

At the 2000 census there were 945 people, 386 households, and 286 families in the town.  The population density was 21.8 people per square mile (8.4/km).  There were 534 housing units at an average density of 12.3 per square mile (4.8/km).  The racial makeup of the town was 98.84% White, 0.32% Native American, 0.21% Asian, 0.21% from other races, and 0.42% from two or more races. Hispanic or Latino of any race were 0.74%.

Of the 386 households 30.1% had children under the age of 18 living with them, 65.3% were married couples living together, 6.2% had a female householder with no husband present, and 25.9% were non-families. 19.9% of households were one person and 6.7% were one person aged 65 or older.  The average household size was 2.45 and the average family size was 2.80.

The age distribution was 23.5% under the age of 18, 4.2% from 18 to 24, 31.1% from 25 to 44, 28.8% from 45 to 64, and 12.4% 65 or older.  The median age was 40 years. For every 100 females, there were 97.3 males.  For every 100 females age 18 and over, there were 96.5 males.

The median household income was $44,659 and the median family income  was $58,068. Males had a median income of $33,958 versus $25,223 for females. The per capita income for the town was $23,263.  About 3.5% of families and 5.1% of the population were below the poverty line, including 2.4% of those under age 18 and 7.9% of those age 65 or over.

Notable people 

 Fairfax Downey (1893–1990), author
 William Allen Knowlton (1920–2008), US Army general, father-in-law of David Petraeus
 David Petraeus (born 1952), US Army general, former director of the Central Intelligence Agency
 Jeriah Swetland (1817–1906), Ohio state representative (1867–1869)

Internet connectivity
The town is served by the provider Consolidated Communications. They provide options for both Fiber-optic and DSL, the latter being phased out in preference for the former. The new plans for fiber range in speeds from 50 megabit to 1 gigabit, and while DSL is still available, it is much slower and less reliable (although slightly cheaper) then the fiber options.

In the part of Springfield that is in the community of Eastman, there is also the internet provider Comcast which provides a high of about 300 Mb/s down and 15 Mb/s up.

References

External links

 
 New Hampshire Economic and Labor Market Information Bureau Profile

 
Towns in Sullivan County, New Hampshire
Towns in New Hampshire